Felipe Souza may refer to:

 Felipe Souza (footballer, born 1991), Brazilian football midfielder
 Felipe Souza (footballer, born 1998), Brazilian football forward

See also
 Felipe Sousa (born 1999), Brazilian football forward